The following is a list of releases created by American metalcore band Coalesce.

Studio albums

A Give Them Rope was reissued as Give Them Rope, She Said in 2004 with new artwork.
B Ox peaked at number 28 on the US Top Heatseekers chart.

Extended plays

C A 7" vinyl that includes two new songs in a hand screened gatefold. Will also be released on iTunes in October.

Split albums

Compilation albums

D An untraditionally shaped vinyl-only release of early demos.

Video albums

E Contains 15 full shows on four discs. It is only available through Coalesces' website and live shows.

References

 
Rock music group discographies
Discographies of American artists